Del mio meglio (stylized as ...del mio meglio) is a compilation album by Italian singer Mina released in 1971 by PDU. The first in a series of compilation albums released under the "Del mio meglio" title.

The songs "Io vivrò (senza te)", "Se stasera sono qui", "Vedrai vedrai" and "Yesterday" were all recorded in 1970 during a concert at Radiotelevisione svizzera and were previously unreleased on album (as well as Mina's new hit "Io e te da soli").

Track listing

Personnel
 Mina – vocals (all tracks)
 Alberto Baldan Bembo – pipe organ (A1, A3, A4)
 Pino Presti – bass (A1, A3, A4)
 Ernesto Massimo Verardi – electric guitar (A1, A3, A4)
 Rolando Ceragioli – drums (A1, A3, A4)
 Mario Robbiani – arrangement, conducting (A1, A3, A4)
 Gian Piero Reverberi – arrangement (A6)
 Bruno Canfora – arrangement (B1)
 Detto Mariano – arrangement (B4)
 Luis Bacalov – arrangement (B5)
 Augusto Martelli – arrangement (A2, A5, B2, B3, B6)

Charts

References

External links
 

Mina (Italian singer) compilation albums
1971 compilation albums
Italian-language compilation albums